Christine Bakke (born June 3, 1971) is an American LGBT rights activist. Bakke spent four years in the ex-gay movement attempting to alter her sexual orientation through conversion therapy. In addition to receiving pastoral counseling and discipleship training, she attended ex-gay programs, including Where Grace Abounds in Denver, CO and the Living Waters Program.

In April 2007, along with gay performance activist Peterson Toscano, Bakke co-founded Beyond Ex-Gay. In May 2007, Glamour Magazine featured Bakke's experience as an ex-gay survivor, or ex-ex-gay. She has also appeared on ABC's Good Morning America,  and Colorado Public Radio.

Bakke participated in the Ex-Gay Survivor Conference held June 29-July 1, 2007 in Irvine, CA and took part in Survivor Initiative, a series of press conferences sponsored by Soulforce, whereby former ex-gays shared their experiences with the public as a witness and a warning about the dangers of the ex-gay movement. For the Survivor Initiative, Bakke designed original collages for each of the speakers to present.

See also

 Queer theology

References

External links
Rising Up Whole, Bakke's blog

1971 births
Living people
People self-identified as ex-ex-gay
LGBT people from Colorado
American LGBT rights activists
21st-century American LGBT people